Primitive Peoples is a 1949 three-part documentary about the people of Arnhem Land. It was narrated by Peter Finch who also worked as camera assistant during filming.

References

External links
Primitive Peoples at National Film and Sound Archive

1949 films
Documentary films about Aboriginal Australians
Australian documentary films
1949 documentary films
Australian black-and-white films
1940s English-language films